Bernardino Parasole (c. 17th century) was an Italian painter of the Baroque period.

He was born to the painters Isabella and Leonardo Parasole, but then apprenticed with Giuseppe Cesari. Bernardino died young.

References

17th-century Italian painters
Italian male painters
Italian Baroque painters
Year of death unknown
Year of birth unknown